Albert was a federal electoral district in New Brunswick, Canada, that was represented in the House of Commons of Canada from 1867 to 1904.

The district was proclaimed in the British North America Act of 1867, and was abolished in 1903 when it was merged into King's and Albert riding.  It consisted of the County of Albert.

Members of Parliament
This riding elected the following Members of Parliament:

Election results

See also 
 List of Canadian federal electoral districts
 Past Canadian electoral districts

External links
Riding history from the Library of Parliament

Former federal electoral districts of New Brunswick